Shahrabad (also Romanized as Shahrābād) is a village in Mobarakeh Rural District, in the Central District of Bafq County, Yazd Province, Iran. At the 2006 census, its population was 29, in 9 families.

References 

Populated places in Bafq County